Hatsumi Shibata (しばたはつみ; April 11, 1952 – March 27, 2010) was a Japanese singer. She also went by the earlier stage name Hatsumi Kanna, Mamanika.

Career 
Born in Shinjuku, Tokyo, she was an only child. Her father was the jazz pianist Yasushi Shibata and her mother a vocalist. Iyo Matsumoto was a second cousin.

From the age of 9, she started singing at the officers' club in the US military camp. In 1967, when she was 15, she sang a commercial song for a fashion maker. She debuted as Hatsumi Kanna in 1968 with Victor with the song Otome no Kisetsu/B-Side: Koi to Umi to Taiyo to.

After graduating from Rissho Gakuen High School, she lived in the United States for two years, before returning to Japan and debuting Hatsumi Shibata in 1974 with Nippon Columbia with the single Gokey.

In the 1970s, he studied under the jazz pianist Yuzuru Sera, before releasing the 1975 album The Woman Who Sings the Blues. Her 1977 single My Luxury Night became a hit at number 17 on the Oricon charts. She was an active live concert performer as a jazz vocalist both in Japan, the United States and other countries.

On March 27, 2010, she died aged 57 of an acute myocardial infarction.

Awards 

 1968- 1st Shinjuku Music Festival Gold Award (Hatsumi Kanna)
 1975- 1st Spain Mallorca Music Festival Runner-up, Simpatico Award
 1975 - 4th Nakano Sunplaza Music Festival Jury Encouragement Award
 1975 - 4th Tokyo Music Festival Domestic Tournament Golden Canary Award
 1975 - 4th Tokyo Music Festival World Tournament, Bronze Prize, Foreign Jury Award
 1977- 9th TV Awards Special Award " Sound in "S" "
 1981 - The 10th Tokyo Music Festival World Tournament Best Singing Award
 1996- 12th Japan Jazz Vocal Award Grand Prize

References

2010 deaths
1952 births
People from Tokyo Metropolis
Nippon Columbia artists
Japanese women jazz singers